The 1982 Pot Black was a professional invitational snooker tournament, which was held between 28 and 31 December 1981 in the Pebble Mill Studios in Birmingham. 8 players were competing in 2 four player groups. The matches are one-frame shoot-outs in the group stages, 2 frame aggregate scores in the semi-finals and the best of 3 frames in the final.

Broadcasts were on BBC2 and started at 21:00 on Tuesday 5 January 1982  Alan Weeks presented the programme with Ted Lowe as commentator and John Williams as referee.

World snooker champion Steve Davis won his first Pot Black title beating show veteran Eddie Charlton 2–0.

Main draw

Group 1

Group 2

Knockout stage

References

Pot Black
1982 in snooker
1982 in English sport